Grosourdya is a genus of flowering plants from the orchid family, Orchidaceae. As of May 2022, it contains 26 known species, native to Southeast Asia.

Grosourdya appendiculata (Blume) Rchb.f. - widespread from Hainan to the Andaman Islands to the Philippines and Maluku
Grosourdya bicornuta J.J.Wood & A.L.Lamb - Sabah
Grosourdya bigibba  (Schltr.) Kocyan & Schuit. 
Grosourdya callifera Seidenf. - Thailand
Grosourdya ciliata  (Ridl.) Kocyan & Schuit.
Grosourdya decipiens  (J.J.Sm.) Kocyan & Schuit.
Grosourdya emarginata  (Blume) Rchb.f.
Grosourdya fasciculata  (Carr) Kocyan & Schuit.
Grosourdya incurvicalcar (J.J.Sm.) Garay - Java, Peninsular Malaysia, Sulawesi
Grosourdya leytensis  (Ames) Kocyan & Schuit.
Grosourdya lobata  (J.J.Wood & A.L.Lamb) Kocyan & Schuit.
Grosourdya milneri  P.O'Byrne, Gokusing & J.J.Wood
Grosourdya mindanaensis  (Ames) Kocyan & Schuit.
Grosourdya minutiflora (Ridl.) Garay - Pahang
Grosourdya minutissima  P.T.Ong & P.O'Byrne
Grosourdya multistrata  P.O'Byrne, J.J.Verm. & S.M.L.Lee
Grosourdya muscosa (Rolfe) Garay - Peninsular Malaysia, Thailand, Andaman Islands 
Grosourdya myosurus  (Ridl.) Kocyan & Schuit.
Grosourdya nitida  (Seidenf.) Kocyan & Schuit.
Grosourdya pulvinifera (Schltr.) Garay - Sabah, Sulawesi
Grosourdya quinquelobata (Schltr.) Garay - Sulawesi
Grosourdya reflexicalcar P.O'Byrne & J.J.Verm.
Grosourdya tripercus (Ames) Garay - Leyte
Grosourdya urunensis J.J.Wood, C.L.Chan & A.L.Lamb - Sabah
Grosourdya vietnamica  (Aver.) Kumar & S.W.Gale
Grosourdya zollingeri (Rchb.f.) Rchb.f. - Java, Maluku

See also 
 List of Orchidaceae genera

References 

  (1864) Botanische Zeitung (Berlin) 22: 297.
  2005. Handbuch der Orchideen-Namen. Dictionary of Orchid Names. Dizionario dei nomi delle orchidee. Ulmer, Stuttgart
  (Eds) (2014) Genera Orchidacearum Volume 6: Epidendroideae (Part 3); page 191 ff., Oxford: Oxford University Press.

External links 

Orchids of Asia
Vandeae genera
Aeridinae